The Belarusian Social Democratic Party (People's Assembly) is an unregistered social-democratic political party in Belarus that opposes the administration of President Alexander Lukashenko.

The party is a full member of the Socialist International.

History 
The BSDP (People's Assembly) was established in March 1991. It calls itself the successor of the Belarusian Socialist Hramada, which was founded in 1903.

The party was left unregistered in 2004, when the government claimed that the reelection of party leader Mikalay Statkevich had been conducted illegally.  Some party members then formed the Belarusian Social Democratic Party (Assembly), which was registered.
 
In legislative elections held between October 13–17, 2004, the party did not secure any seats.

On May 31, 2020, the party's leader Mikola Statkevich was arrested on his way to a rally where signatures for Svetlana Tikhanovskaya were being gathered. He was sentenced to 15 days for participating in an unsanctioned protest. This sentence was extended two more times, and he was tried again on June 29 for organizing unrest. Viasna Human Rights Centre called the accusations politically motivated and demanded the immediate release of Statkevich.

On December 14, 2021, Statkevich was sentenced to 14 years in prison. Along with him, Ihar Losik, Sergei Tikhanovsky and three other political prisoners were also sentenced. Throughout the 565 days he has spent in detention, Statkevich was not allowed to get access to legal representation or defence and he has been denied all contact with his family.

Electoral results

Legislative elections

See also
Belarusian Social Democratic Assembly
Belarusian Social Democratic Party (Assembly)
Social Democratic Party of Popular Accord

References

1996 establishments in Belarus
Full member parties of the Socialist International
Political parties established in 1996
Political parties in Belarus
Social democratic parties in Belarus
Banned socialist parties